Richardsonius is a genus of cyprinid fish consisting of two species native to western North America. Commonly known as redside shiners, that term is also used to refer to Richardsonius balteatus specifically. 
The genus is named after naturalist Sir John Richardson (1787–1865), who described R. balteatus in 1836.

Species 
 Richardsonius balteatus (J. Richardson, 1836) (Redside shiner)
 Richardsonius egregius (Girard, 1858) (Lahontan redside)

References

 
 

 
Fish of North America
Fish of the United States